Malick Fall (born 11 December 1985 in Dakar) is an Olympic swimmer from Senegal. He has swum for Senegal at the 2000, 2004, 2008, and the 2012 Olympics. He is West Africa's most successful swimmer. He was Senegal's flag-bearer at the 2004 Olympics.

He has swum for Senegal at:
 Olympics: 2000, 2004, 2008, 2012
 World Championships: 2001, 2003, 2005, 2007, 2009, 2011, 2013, 2015
 African Games: 2003 (1 silver, 2 bronze), 2007 (2 bronze), 2011 (1 silver)
 African Swimming Championships: 2002 (1 silver, 2 bronze), 2004 (2 gold, 1 silver, 1 bronze), 2006 (1 silver, 1 bronze), 2008 (2 gold, 1 bronze), 2012 (1 gold, 1 silver)

References

1985 births
Living people
Senegalese male swimmers
Swimmers at the 2000 Summer Olympics
Swimmers at the 2004 Summer Olympics
Swimmers at the 2008 Summer Olympics
Swimmers at the 2012 Summer Olympics
Olympic swimmers of Senegal
African Games silver medalists for Senegal
African Games medalists in swimming
African Games bronze medalists for Senegal
Competitors at the 2003 All-Africa Games
Competitors at the 2007 All-Africa Games
Competitors at the 2011 All-Africa Games
Swimmers at the 2015 African Games